Renaico River is a Chilean river that, along all its length, straddles the border between the regions of Bío Bío and La Araucanía. Renaico River rises from the northwest flank of Cordillera de Pemehue, a western spur of the Andes Mountains, north of Tolhuaca volcano. In its upper course, the river parallels the east and north border of Malleco National Reserve. The river terminates approximately 7 km downstream from the city of Renaico, where it joins the Vergara River.

See also
List of rivers of Chile

References

Rivers of Chile
Rivers of Biobío Region
Rivers of Araucanía Region